Venus Against the Son of Hercules (also known as Mars, God of War and The Son of Hercules vs. Venus) is a 1962 Italian peplum film written and directed  by Marcello Baldi and starring Roger Browne and Jackie Lane.

Plot
Mars descends from Mount Olympus to earth to defend a kingdom besieged by invaders led by an African warlord named Afros. The warlord threatens to destroy the kingdom's capital unless they surrender. Antarus, a corrupt and ambitious member of the king's court conspires to become king. His plans include a deal with Afros and marrying Ecuba, daughter of the king. He is distracted by the beautiful maiden Daphne, whose father the king's emissary was recently killed by Afros during the midst of a parley. Afros is killed in a duel with Mars and his army is scattered during a siege. Antarus continues his plot to become king while maneuvering his pawns in court. 

Mars rescues Daphne from a couple of Afros' men during her attempt to recover her father's body on the roadside. After falling in love at first sight with Daphne, Mars reluctantly returns to Olympus to reunite with Venus, who he accuses of deceiving him to look like Daphne on earth. Venus releases Ares, explaining her beauty and grace exists in all mortal women including Daphne who she recognizes Mars is profoundly in love with. He returns to earth in time to learn that Daphne has been condemned to be sacrificed to a carnivorous plant monster alongside a deaf-mute slave girl accused of murdering Ecuba (who was killed by Antarus). Mars arrives with heroic timing to save the women from sacrifice but Daphne is fatally shot with an arrow by Antarus who followed after Mars to kill him. The two fight and Antarus is subsequently cornered and devoured by the monstrous plant. Recognizing Mars' eternal love for Daphne, Jupiter answers his son's prayer and spares her life as she appears waiting in a white chariot. Mars joins her and bids farewell to the king and his people who arrived at the sacrificial site in time to see the pair ride off into the heavens presumably to live on Mount Olympus forever.

Cast

 Roger Browne as Mars 
 Jackie Lane as Daphne 
 Massimo Serato as  Antarus 
 Linda Sini as Ecuba 
  Dante Di Paolo as Frixos 
  Renato Speziali 
  Michèle Bailly as Venus
 John Kitzmiller as Afros 
 Giuseppe Addobbati  
  Renato Navarrini  
 Folco Lulli  
 Corrado Annicelli   
 Aldo Bufi Landi 
 Giulio Donnini  
 Livio Lorenzon  
 Gianni Solaro

Release
Venus Against the Son of Hercules was released in Italy on 24 June 1962. The film was also released as The Son of Hercules vs. Venus and Mars, God of War.

References

Sources

External links

1960s fantasy adventure films
Italian fantasy adventure films
Peplum films
Films directed by Marcello Baldi
Films based on classical mythology
Greek and Roman deities in fiction
Sword and sandal films
1960s Italian films